The Protection from Online Falsehoods and Manipulation Act 2019, commonly abbreviated as POFMA and known colloquially as Fake News Law, is a statute of the Parliament of Singapore that enables authorities to tackle the spread of fake news or false information. 

The law is designed specifically to allow authorities to respond to fake news or false information through a graduated process of enforcing links to fact-checking statements, censorship of website or assets on social media platforms, and criminal charges. The law is controversial and has received criticism both locally and internationally by opposition politicians, human rights groups, journalists and academics.

History 

On 3 April 2017, Minister of Law and Home Affairs K Shanmugam called for a review of existing laws to combat fake news. He cited online portals such as The Real Singapore which published an article falsely claiming that a commotion between Thaipusam participants and the police was sparked by complaints from a Filipino family, the States Times Review which mocked former President S. R. Nathan with an article claiming near-zero turnout for his funeral, and All Singapore Stuff which falsely reported eye-witness accounts of a collapsed HDB roof at Punggol Waterway Terraces, subsequently wasting SPF and SCDF resources during the follow-up investigation. The Minister claimed that fake news, when not debunked, can quickly cause harm to Singaporeans, panic to public, waste emergency resources, and damage reputations of businesses and people. He also claimed that "nasty" people seek to profit from fake news and that foreign agencies and foreign governments seek to destabilise the government through fake news.

On 10 January 2018, 80 MPs present voted unanimously in Parliament to appoint a Select Committee of eight PAP MPs, one opposition MP and one NMP to study and report on the problem of deliberate online falsehoods and recommend strategies to deal with them. The Select Committee convened public hearings from 14 March to 29 March 2018, lasting eight days in total, where 79 individuals and organisations were invited to testify.

On 1 April 2019, the Protection from Online Falsehoods and Manipulation (POFMA) Bill was tabled in parliament for first reading. The Ministry of Law stated that the legislation seeks to protect the society from deliberate online falsehoods created by malicious actors by targeting falsehoods, not opinions and criticisms, nor satire or parody. It defines a falsehood as a statement of fact that is false or misleading. After concerns were raised about the Bill's scope, ministers gave reassurances that the bill will not affect free speech. The Bill was passed with a 72–9 vote, with all Workers Party (WP) MPs voting against it, on 8 May 2019 after a two-day debate.

The POFMA came into effect on 2 October 2019, with the Infocomm Media Development Authority (IMDA) being the agency administering Act through a dedicated office. Subsidiary legislation is also laid out in the Act detailing how the Act will work, including court challenges that take nine days at maximum and cost as little as $200.

During the COVID-19 pandemic, the Ministry of Communications and Information lifted the exemption of social media platforms, search engines and Internet intermediaries from complying with POFMA. These platforms were required to comply with general correction directions issued from 31 January 2020. The exemptions initially applied when the law first took effect.

Between July 2020 and April 2021, there was an eight-month period in which no POFMA uses were recorded.

On 20 May 2021, POFMA was invoked to have Twitter and Facebook carry a notification with a correction notice to "all end-users in Singapore" regarding falsehoods about a "Singapore Variant" of COVID-19. This marks the first time in which all end-users of a social media platform received a correction notice, as opposed to only the users who had accessed directly the falsehood in question.

As of February 2022, there have been 82 recorded instances of POFMA's usage.

Purpose 
There were concerns that the Act would enable authorities to suppress criticism and dissent. Section 2(2)(b) defines a false statement as "if it is false or misleading, whether wholly or in part, and whether on its own or in the context in which it appears". Satire, parody, opinions and criticisms are expressively not covered by the POFMA Act.

Section 3 of the Act covers any statements that are made available to one or more end-users in Singapore via the internet, SMS or MMS. The platforms include social media platforms, such as Facebook, Twitter, Google, and other online closed groups such private chat groups and social media groups.

The purpose of the Act, as outlined in section 5, is to:

 to prevent the communication of false statements of fact in Singapore and to enable measures to be taken to counteract the effects of such communication;
 to suppress the financing, promotion and other support of online locations that repeatedly communicate false statements of fact in Singapore;
 to enable measures to be taken to detect, control and safeguard against coordinated inauthentic behaviour and other misuses of online accounts and bots; and
 to enable measures to be taken to enhance disclosure of information concerning paid content directed towards a political end.

Prohibited activities and penalties 
Part 2 of the POFMA Act criminalises the communication of false statements of facts in Singapore through Section 7 even if the person communicating it is not in Singapore, and that the false statement is detrimental to "the security of Singapore", "public health, public safety, public tranquillity or public finances", friendly international relations with other countries, influence the outcome of parliamentary and presidential elections or referendums, incite tension between different groups of people, or diminish public confidence in the public service or general governance of Singapore.

Through Section 8, the creation and usage of bots or enabling another person to utilise, with the intention to communicate a false statement of fact in Singapore is prohibited. Section 9 prohibits solicit, receive, or agree to receive a benefit for providing a service which the person knows is or will be used to communicate a false statement of fact in Singapore, if the service is in fact used in the communication. However, Section 9 is not applicable on intermediary services such as internet intermediaries, telecommunications services, public internet access services, or a computing resource service.

Contravening these prohibitions may see fines and/or prison terms imposed on the offender.

Correction mechanism 
A Correction Direction may be sent out to a communicator of the false statement, instructing the person to place a notice stating that the statement was found to be false and a correction of the false statement. The placement location of this notice may also be specified at an online location or in close proximity of the false statement, or in newspapers. A Stop Communication Direction may be issued as well, instructing the person to disable access of the false statement to end-users in Singapore by a specific time.

Concurrently, a Targeted Correction Direction may be sent to internet intermediaries and providers of mass media services to communicate the correction notice in response to a false statement to end-users in Singapore. A Disabling Direction may be issued to disable access an online location to end-users in Singapore. A General Correction Direction may be sent to instruct publication of correction notice on the relevant platforms.

If an online location has three or more false statements, it may be tagged as an declared online location. A declared online location will need to place a notice of such declaration for up to two years, and are not able to receive any financial support.

Non-compliance of these Directions may accrue fines and/or prison terms by the offender. An Access Block Order on online location may be issued in event of noncompliance as well to instruct  Infocomm Media Development Authority (IMDA) to order internet service providers to disable access to the online location.

To deal with fake accounts and bots, an Account Restriction Direction may be issued to order an internet intermediary to shut down any fake accounts and bots on its platforms and/or prevent the accounts' owners from interacting with end-users in Singapore.

Government ministers will issue instructions to correct falsehoods through an appointed Competent Authority, as laid out in Section 6. The Ministry of Communications and Information established a POFMA Office within IMDA to administer the law, on basis that IMDA has relevant connections to the tech industry and experience in administering the Broadcasting Act and other similar content regulation policies. The POFMA Office maintains a registry of Declared Online Locations and also establishes a mechanism for the general public to apply for a relevant Direction or Declaration to the relevant ministry. All applications to vary or cancel any Directions or Declaration must be made within 14 days to the High Court.

5-step framework in setting aside orders in a court 
A 2021 landmark judgement saw the Court of Appeal formulating a 5-step framework for a court to follow in deciding to set aside the correction orders or directions in future cases.

Notable uses 
The first Correction Direction was issued to Brad Bowyer, a Progress Singapore Party member, to place a correction notice on statements of falsehoods which implied that the Government controls Temasek’s and GIC’s commercial decisions, that billions of dollars in investments were wasted on the canned Amaravati city project, and Salt Bae's parent company, which received an investment from Temasek, was debt-laden. The commercial decisions made by Temasek and GIC are asserted to be independent, while only millions of dollars was sunk into the city project, and the investment made in D.ream International BV, and not in one of D.ream International BV’s shareholders called Doğuş Holding that was reportedly in difficulties. Bowyer placed the correction notice when he received the Direction. The PSP subsequently protested, stating that "the Act falls short of the values of transparency, independence and accountability" and that it could be used by ministers to declare a piece of news to be "falsehood, without requiring any justification, criteria or standards". Ministry of Law refuted stating that the reasons to use the law were stated clearly, and that the correction notice does not curtail one's freedom of speech, and will instead help end-users make up their mind as to what is the truth.

The second Correction Direction was issued to Alex Tan on 28 November 2019 to place a correction notice on a falsehood in a post on the Straits Times Review's Facebook page alleging that People's Action Party would field a Christian evangelist as a candidate in the upcoming elections to garner support from Christian community and possibly turning Singapore into a Christian state, and that a whistleblower was arrested and would be charged for "fabricating fake news". The claims were found to be false and baseless, with no one being arrested and charged while the site made other “scurrilous, absurd” allegations on Singapore's election process. However, Tan did not intend to comply, saying that he is no longer a Singapore citizen and now lives abroad. This resulted a Targeted Correction Direction being issued to Facebook to place the correction notice on the Facebook post. Tan and his Facebook pages were subjected to subsequent Declared Online Locations, which he did not comply, and Facebook was then mandated to disable Singapore users' access to his pages. Facebook complied, however with concerns that "blocking orders such as this are severe and risk being misused to stifle voices and perspectives on the internet".

During the 2020 Singaporean general election 

The month of the 2020 general election (July 2020), saw the greatest number of POFMA uses per month since the law's introduction. In July 2020, during the campaigning period of the general election, five correction directions were issued to the National University of Singapore Society, CNA, The Online Citizen and New Naratif by the Ministry of Health (MOH) and Ministry of Manpower (MOM) jointly, taking issue on the following statements made, which the ministries said to be false: MOM's email advisory to employers on testing of migrant workers was made without the advice from public health medical professionals
 MOM's advisory stated that employers would lose their work pass privileges if they brought their workers for Covid-19 testing
 MOM actively discouraged the testing of workersIn response, the Singapore Democratic Party's chairman Professor Paul Tambyah stated that what he said was from a circular from MOM and the advisory was signed by an MOM official, not anybody from Ministry of Health. He added the correction direction was an inappropriate use of POFMA and a complete distraction. He wanted to focus on issues that matter to Singaporeans, instead of arguing about who signed a circular.

2021 landmark judgement by the Court of Appeal 
The Singapore Democratic Party (SDP) and The Online Citizen (TOC) were the first few parties to challenge some of the Directions set upon them. On 14 December 2019, SDP was directed by Ministry of Manpower (MOM) to correct two Facebook posts and an article on its website, in which SDP advanced a position that there was a rising trend of retrechments among the Singaporean professionals, managers, executives and technicians (PMETS). SDP filed an appeal to MOM, however was rejected. SDP then chose to apply to the High Court to cancel the order that is set against it. On 22 January 2020, TOC, as well as Singaporean activist Kirsten Han and Yahoo! Singapore were issued with correction orders by Ministry of Home Affairs (MHA) over the content they had posted on their platforms over the allegations of "Singapore prison officers carry[ing] out brutal execution method" by Malaysian-based Lawyers For Liberty. Similaly to SDP's case, TOC filed an appeal to MHA, however was rejected. TOC then chose to apply to the High Court to cancel the order set against it.

Both cases were heard separately, by different High Court judges, but had the same outcome: their appeals to cancel the orders were denied. However, in both cases, the judgement on the burden of proof differed. Justice Ang Cheng Hock in SDP's case found that the burden of proof is to be borne by the minister, while Justice Belinda Ang in TOC's case found that the burden of proof is to be borne by the party making the statements that were being corrected.

Both SDP and TOC decided to file their appeals to the apex court, Court of Appeal. Due to the closeness in time of the cases, and the legal matters to be heard, both cases were heard together in the Court of Appeal. However, in September 2020, a panel of senior judges in the Court of Appeal reserved judgement on several legal issues, one of them is whether the burden of proof fell on the statement maker or the minister.

On 8 October 2021, the rulings by the Court of Appeal was delivered. Among the matters heard were the constitutionality of POFMA; the burden of proof falls on which party; on whether reporting a falsehood counts as making a falsehood. It also delivered a five-step legal framework which courts can use to apply on whether to set aside a correction order in the future. It also put a finality on the statements made by SDP and TOC, as to whether they were fake or not.

The panel of judges found that POFMA was not unconstitutional. It also found that a part of the SDP's orders was invalid while the rest of SDP's statements and TOC's were false. However, on the same day of the release of the judgement, MOM issued a new Correction Order to cover the invalidated portion of the previous Correction Order.

Criticism

Local criticism 
During the parliamentary debate over the proposed Act, Pritam Singh of the Workers' Party, who was a member of the 13th Parliament of Singapore representing Aljunied GRC, criticised the legislation, saying that "ministers should not be the deciding body on what constitutes false matters". Pritam argued that the Government should still be able to take down false claims, however the courts should be the avenue which such orders can be legitimise, as an understanding of legislation was that it gave "broad latitude to the executive to clamp down on what is misleading but which may not be false per se". Pritam's fellow member, Sylvia Lim commented that the process to appeal against the orders could be "very onerous" to the applicants due to "information asymmetry between the Government and individuals".

An editorial on The Online Citizen questioned why POFMA was not applied on foreign news outlets where there are false statements, and diplomats were responding with lengthy letters to disagree with the false statements instead. Dozens of journalists signed an open letter stating "By failing to distinguish between a malicious falsehood and a genuine mistake, the proposed legislation places an unnecessarily onerous burden on even journalists acting in good faith".

International criticism 
The Act was criticised by human rights groups and free speech organisations. Reporters Without Borders claimed that the bill was "terrible", stating that it is "totalitarian" and used as a tool to regulate public debates. Reuters states that the Act "ensnares" government critics. Two years after the Act was passed, the International Commission of Jurists called for the government to repeal or at least make amends to the Act, so that it does not "arbitrarily restrict the right to freedom of expression and information online".

After having to remove several posts under the Act, Facebook stated that it was "concerned" by the "broad powers" the act provides the Singaporean government with.

Media Literacy Council apology 
In 2020, the Media Literacy Council (MLC), an outreach programme under IMDA which promotes digital and media literacy, included satire as an "example" of fake news in one of its Facebook posts and info-graphics on 5 September 2019. The MLC took down the post and issued an apology for the confusion on 8 September, saying that they would review their materials. Minister Shanmugam attributed it as a mistake or inaccuracy being made by the MLC, reassuring that satire does not count as fake news.

See also 

 Fake news

 Select Committee on Deliberate Online Falsehoods, a select committee which led to the recommendation of this law
Anti-social Media Bill (Nigeria)
Network Enforcement Act (Germany)

References

Further reading

External links 

 Protection from Online Falsehoods and Manipulation Act legislation text
 POFMA Office - Office within Infocomm Media Development Authority that is responsible for the administration of the law

2019 in law
2019 in Singapore
Fake news
Singaporean legislation
Freedom of speech in Singapore
Impact of the COVID-19 pandemic on legislation